Ballinran Court Tomb (sometimes known as the Giant's Grave) is situated close to Killowen, County Down, Northern Ireland, on the shore of Carlingford Lough. The site was excavated in April and May 1976 in preparation for a road widening project.

No trace of burial deposits was found in situ, although some cremated, presumably human, bone and three primary flint flakes were found. A 'nest' of winkle shells were found placed in a pit as a secondary deposit in the grave.

References

Archaeological sites in County Down
Buildings and structures in Northern Ireland
Geography of County Down
Tombs in the United Kingdom